"Medicate" is a song by AFI from their album Crash Love.

Medicate may also refer to:
"Medicate" (Gabbie Hanna song)
"Medicate", a song by Breaking Benjamin from the album Saturate
"Medicate", a song by Luna Halo from their self-titled album